JYP is an ice hockey team playing in the Finnish top division Liiga. They play in Jyväskylä, Finland, at the LähiTapiola Areena.

History
JYP was founded in 1923. First it was the ice hockey section of the sports club Jyväskylän Palloilijat until 1977. Then they separated from that sports club to be an independent hockey club called JyP HT. The current full name of the club is JYP Jyväskylä Oy, having been registered as an osakeyhtiö since 1999. JYP has won the Finnish SM-liiga twice, in 2009 and 2012, having been the losing side in the play-off finals in 1989 and 1992.

Early years
JYP was founded in 1923 as Jyväskylän Palloilijat (Jyväskylä's Ballsport players in English). Originally the club was multi-sport club having competitive departments in football, pesäpallo (Finnish baseball), bandy and later ice hockey and basketball. In 1977 JyP divided due to financial reasons and ice hockey department began with new club, JyP HT (officially Jyväskylän Palloilijat Hockey Team) while football department formed JyP-77 (JJK Jyväskylä nowadays).

The new club started in I Division, the then-second tier of Finnish hockey. JyP HT promoted to the top tier for the 1985-86 SM-liiga season. With ambitious aims, they were fifth after regular season and surprisingly eliminated out of play-offs by only two points. At the next season, the target was in play-offs but seventh place was not enough. When the beginning of the third season was disappointment, head coach Erkka Westerlund – subsequently Finnish national team coach – got sacked.

Partnership with the Boston Bruins
On 8 September 2010, JYP entered into a partnership agreement with the Boston Bruins of the National Hockey League (NHL), to enable player transfer and training between the two teams and their developmental systems.

Players

2020–21 roster

Honours

Champions
 SM-liiga Kanada-malja (2): 2008–09, 2011–12

Runners-up
 SM-liiga Kanada-malja (2): 1988–89, 1991–92
 SM-liiga Kanada-malja (5): 1992–93, 2009–10, 2012–13, 2014–15, 2016–17

European titles
European Trophy:
 Winners (1): 2013

Champions Hockey League:
 Winners (1): 2018

Notable players

 Jaroslav Bednář
 Dwight Helminen
 Juha-Pekka Hytönen
 Jarkko Immonen
 Steve Kariya
 Jari Lindroos
 Steve Martins
 Jyri Marttinen
 Michael Nylander
 Mika Noronen
 Rich Peverley
 Antti Pihlström
 Jody Shelley
 Pavel Torgayev
 Petr Ton
 Sinuhe Wallinheimo
 Duvie Westcott
 Robert Rooba

Honored members
1  Ari-Pekka Siekkinen
10  Pertti Rastela
13  Riikka Sallinen
19  Pentti Mikkilä
30  Risto Kurkinen

NHL alumni

 Yohann Auvitu
 Olli Määttä
 Joonas Nättinen
 Harri Pesonen
 Tuomas Pihlman
 Raimo Summanen 
 Sami Vatanen

References

External links
 JYP official web site

Sport in Jyväskylä
Liiga teams
1923 establishments in Finland
Liiga 
Ice hockey clubs established in 1923